Valentina is a 1981 Soviet drama film directed by Gleb Panfilov.

Plot 
The film takes place in a small taiga settlement. The film tells about the 18-year-old girl Valentina, who is in love with the investigator and does not hide her feelings. But here's the trouble: the aggressive Pavel loves her and believes that she will become his wife.

Cast 
 Rodion Nahapetov as Vladimir Mikhailovich Shamanov - a policeman-investigator (as Rodion Nakhapetov)
 Inna Churikova as Anna Vasilievna Khoroshikh - the dining-room host
 Yuri Grebenshchikov as Afanasi Dergachov - Anna's husband
 Sergey Koltakov as Pavel 'Pashka' - Anna's son
 Darya Mikhaylova as Valentina - the dining-room waitress (as Dasha Mikhailova)
 Vasili Korzun as Fyodor Pomigalov - Valentina's father
 Larisa Udovichenko as Zinaida 'Zina' Kashkina - a pharmacist
 Vsevolod Shilovsky as Innokenti Stepanovich Mechetkin - an accountant
 Maksim Munzuk as Ilya Eremeyev
 Anatoli Panfilov as The diesel-electric power station operator

References

External links 
 

1981 films
1980s Russian-language films
Soviet drama films
1981 drama films